Rußbach am Paß Gschütt is a municipality in the Hallein district in the Austrian state of Salzburg.
It is famous for its amazing skiing and summer mountain biking tours and extensive network of hiking trails. It is a must-visit town in Austria and only 40 minutes by car from Salzburg. René Reschreiter is also known here as the person for anything carved out of wood.

Geography
The municipality lies in the Rußbach valley, a tributary of the Lammer River in the Tennengau.

References

Dachstein Mountains
Cities and towns in Hallein District